The 2008–09 Al-Hilal FC season was Al-Hilal Saudi Football Club's 52nd in existence and 33rd consecutive season in the top flight of Saudi Arabian football. Along with Pro League, the club participated in the AFC Champions League, Crown Prince Cup, and the King Cup.

Players

Squad information

Pro League

Matches

Crown Prince Cup

King Cup of Champions

Quarter-finals

Semi-finals

Third Place

2009 AFC Champions League

Knockout stage

Round of 16

Statistics

Goalscorers

References

Al Hilal SFC seasons
Hilal